The Felix Events Center is a 3,500-seat multi-purpose arena in Azusa, California, USA. It hosts locals sporting events and concerts.  It is home of the Azusa Pacific University Cougars men's and women's basketball teams and volleyball team. It was the former home of the SoCal Legends when they played in the American Basketball Association. The arena opened in 2001.

Azusa Pacific University's Acro and Tumbling team have been using the arena since their inaugural season in 2010.

References

External links
http://www.apu.edu/eventcenter/

American Basketball Association (2000–present) venues
Basketball venues in California
Indoor arenas in California
Volleyball venues in California
Sports venues completed in 2001
Azusa Pacific Cougars
2001 establishments in California